The women's 10,000 metres event at the 2009 Summer Universiade was held on 7 July.

Results

References

Results (archived)

10000
2009 in women's athletics
2009